Texel is an island and municipality of the Netherlands.

Texel may also refer to:
Texel (sheep), a breed of sheep originally from Texel
Texel (graphics), texture element or texture pixel, the unit of texture space used in computer graphics
Texel (guinea pig), a variety of guinea pig
Texel Group, a group of mountains in South Tyrol in Italy

See also
Texel Disaster, the sinking of two British destroyers by German mines off the coast of Texel island on 31 August 1940
Battle of Texel (disambiguation)